Prussian Blue is the debut solo studio album by Australian rock musician, Richard Clapton, which was released in November 1973. It includes three singles, "Last Train to Marseilles" (October 1972), "All the Prodigal Children" (October 1973) and "I Wanna Be a Survivor" (July 1974). The album was produced by Richard Batchens, who later produced some of Sherbet's albums. Prussian Blue failed to appear on the Kent Music Report Albums Chart.

Reception 

Garry Raffaele of The Canberra Times reviewed Prussian Blue in December 1973, he observed, "Clapton sounds as though he's involved with the real issues of our time — pollution, man's inhumanity to those who share Spaceship Earth with him, communication difficulties. He writes of these things but his words are not likely to convince anybody. It's the simplistic trap again."

Track listing

Personnel

Musicians
 Richard Clapton – vocals, acoustic guitar; harmonica (track 9)
 Keith Barber – drums (track 1, 6)
 Ian Bloxham – congas (track 1, 4), percussion (track 3)
 Tony Bolton – drums (track 7)
 Kevin Borich – lead guitar (track 1, 3, 6)
 John Capek – piano (track 7)
 John du Bois – bass guitar (track 7)
 Russell Dunlop – drums (track 5, 8, 9)
 the Fascinations – backing vocals (track 1, 8)
 Glen Gardier – lead guitar (track 4)
 Kenny Kitching – pedal steel guitar (track 2, 7, 8, 9)
 Mike Lawler – bass guitar (track 5, 8, 9)
 Mike McLelland – guitar (track 10)
 Red McKelvie – lead guitar (track 2, 7)
 Dave Ovenden – drums (track 2, 3)
 Ronnie Peel – bass guitar (track 1, 6)
 Mike Perjanik – piano (track 3), keyboards (track 5, 8), organ (track 6)
 Don Read – saxophone (track 1, 4, 5)
 Trevor Wilson – bass guitar (track 2, 3)

Recording details
 Richard Batchens – producer at Festival Studios, Sydney

Artwork
 Graham McCarter – cover photography
 Phillip Morris – back cover photography
 Stephen Nelson – design/art

Release history

References

External links
Richard Clapton - Prussian Blue at Itunes

Richard Clapton albums
Festival Records albums
Infinity Records albums
1973 debut albums
Albums produced by Richard Batchens